Nick Franklin may refer to:
 Nick Franklin (executive), Disney executive
 Nick Franklin (baseball), American baseball player